The Hussain Shahi dynasty was a family which ruled the late medieval Sunni Muslim Sultanate of Bengal from 1494 to 1538.

History
The dynasty's founder, Alauddin Husain Shah was claimed to have Arab ancestry and was apparently a descendant of Husayn ibn Ali, and therefore, a Sayyid. This is doutbful, since it was a common phenomenon at this time in the Indian subcontinent for native rulers to claim foreign ancestry, in order to enhance their status. Alauddin Hussain Shah is considered as the greatest of all the sultans of Bengal for bringing a cultural renaissance during his reign. He conquered Kamrup-Kamata and Orissa and extended the Sultanate all the way to the port of Chittagong, which witnessed the arrival of the first Portuguese merchants. His supposed heir, Shahzada Danyal, who he had appointed as the governor of Kamata, was executed by rebellious chieftains in Assam.

Husain Shah's son and successor, Nasiruddin Nasrat Shah, gave refuge to the Afghans during the invasion of Babur though he remained neutral. Known as the Akbar of Bengal, Nasrat was known by the Hindus of Bengal as Nripati Tilak and Jagatbhusan. He encouraged the translation of Sanskrit literature into the Bengali language and built the Chota Sona Masjid. Nasrat Shah's treaty with Babur saved Bengal from a Mughal invasion.

The last Sultan of the dynasty, Ghiyasuddin Mahmud Shah, who continued to rule from Sonargaon, had to contend with rising Afghan activity on his northwestern border. Eventually, the Afghans under the Sur Empire broke through and sacked the capital in 1538 where they remained for several decades, successively establishing two independent dynasties (Muhammad Shahi and Karrani). However, the Bengal Sultanate collapsed not long after, transforming Bengal into a confederacy of chieftains known as the Baro-Bhuiyans. This loose confederacy of Bengal was ruled by Isa Khan, one of Ghiyasuddin Mahmud Shah's grandsons through his daughter Syeda Momena Khatun. Khan was subsequently succeeded by his son, Musa Khan, though his grandson, Masum Khan, was a mere zamindar.

Rulers

See also
List of rulers of Bengal
History of Bengal
List of Sunni Muslim dynasties

References

 
1538 in India
Sunni dynasties